Nimpkish Lake is a lake on in the Northern Vancouver Island region of British Columbia, Canada.  It is the location of Nimpkish Lake Provincial Park and is 32 km south of Port McNeill.  The lake is in the traditional territory of the Namgis First Nation, who are its namesake.  It is part of the drainage basin of the Nimpkish River.

References

Lakes of British Columbia
Northern Vancouver Island
Rupert Land District